August of Saxony (7 September 1589, Dresden – 26 December 1615, Naumburg) from the Albertine line of the House of Wettin was Administrator of the diocese of Naumburg-Zeitz.

Life 
August was the youngest son of the elector Christian I of Saxony (1560–1591) from his marriage to Sophie of Brandenburg (1568–1622), daughter of the elector John George of Brandenburg. His older brothers Christian II and John George I were successively Electors of Saxony.  From the latter August received an annual pension of 21,000 florins and the district of Senftenberg.

August graduated from the University of Wittenberg, where Wolfgang Hirschbach had been entrusted the task to guide this young nobleman in his training. During this period he held from the winter semester 1601 until 1606, the position of Rector Magnificus; the academic aspect of this office was performed by a pro-rector.

He married on 1 January 1612 in Dresden to Elisabeth of Brunswick-Wolfenbüttel (1593–1650), daughter of the Duke Henry Julius of Brunswick-Wolfenbüttel.  They had no children.

He died suddenly at the age of 26 in Dresden and was buried in the Freiberg Cathedral.

Ancestors

References 
 
 
 Heinrich August Pierer, Universal-Lexikon der Gegenwart und Vergangenheit, 4th edition, Volume 2, Altenburg, 1857, p. 21.

House of Wettin
Saxon princes
1589 births
1615 deaths
Nobility from Dresden
Martin Luther University of Halle-Wittenberg alumni
Albertine branch
Burials at Freiberg Cathedral
Sons of monarchs